Cornelius Johannes Van Eyk (born September 15, 1998) is an American professional baseball pitcher in the Toronto Blue Jays organization. He is ranked 8th on Major League Baseball's 2022 Top 30 Blue Jays prospects list.

Amateur career
Van Eyk attended and graduated from Steinbrenner High School in Lutz, Florida. In 2017, his senior year, he went 5–1 with a 0.73 ERA. He was drafted by the New York Mets in the 19th round of the 2017 Major League Baseball draft, but elected to fulfill his commitment to play college baseball at Florida State University.

In 2018, Van Eyk's freshman year at Florida State, he appeared in 19 games (making five starts) in which he went 7–0 with a 2.86 ERA, striking out 71 batters over  innings, earning ACC All-Freshman honors. As a sophomore in 2019, he started 17 games, going 10–3 with a 3.80 ERA, compiling 120 strikeouts over  innings, earning All-ACC Third Team honors. For the 2020 season, he was named the Seminoles' opening day starter. He appeared in four games before the college baseball season was cut short due to the COVID-19 pandemic.

Professional career
Van Eyk was selected by the Toronto Blue Jays in the second round with the 42nd overall pick of the 2020 Major League Baseball draft. He signed with the Blue Jays on June 18 and received a $1.8 million bonus. 

Van Eyk made his professional debut and spent all of the 2021 season with the Vancouver Canadians of the High-A West, starting 19 games and pitching to a 4-6 record, a 5.83 ERA, and 100 strikeouts over  innings. He underwent Tommy John surgery after the season, forcing him to miss all of 2022.

References

External links

Florida State Seminoles bio

1998 births
Living people
Baseball players from Florida
Baseball pitchers
Florida State Seminoles baseball players
Vancouver Canadians players